Dato' Afdlin Shauki bin Aksan (born 19 May 1971) is a Malaysian producer, screenwriter, director, actor, comedian, singer, songwriter, and television presenter and politician.

Career

Music 
A singer, musician and live performer Afdlin, together with his band Acid Iz, presents a flavour of R&B, acid jazz and funk. His debut album FUUYO! was released in late 2003. In 1992, he performed for an audience of 50,000 in the 'Ikhlas Concert' alongside Zainal Abidin and Sheila Majid among others. He has performed in one of the most respected jazz clubs in Europe such as Ronnie Scott's, as an opening act for Sheila Majid for her 1996 UK Tour. He also made a guest appearance with David Foster's protege Jordan Hill for her 1997 Malaysian tour singing 'Till the end of time'.

He won the Best Ethnic Pop song category at the Anugerah Juara Lagu ke-19 in 2005 for a song he wrote for Dayang Nurfaizah called 'Erti Hidup'.

Television
Afdlin has been working as an actor, director and TV presenter. Afdlin received the award for Best Presenter in an Entertainment Programme during the prestigious 1999 Asian Television Awards for his role as the host on the late night talk show Bila Larut Malam on Astro. He has hosted the illustrious for six years running, as well as game shows, sports, music and lifestyle programmes.

Film making
As a film actor, his local debut was as part of the supporting cast for Pesona Pictures' Mimpi Moon, which was followed by his role as the "Interpreter" in the Hollywood movie "Anna and the King". He played his first romantic lead in Serangkai Filem's Soal Hati, and was honoured with a Best Actor award for his portrayal of "Daniel" at the Anugerah Skrin Panca Delima Awards, 2000. He has since filmed "Soalnya Siapa?", a continuation of the story.

Afdlin has been involved in various direct-to-VCD projects, the latest being "Kelibat", a profit-sharing venture between the actors involved and Vision Works. For this Afdlin wrote, directed and acted, and it was released April 2004

His screen debut as a writer and director, as well as lead actor, manifested in Buli a Grand Brilliance produced film about a technical savant and social misfit in a corporate and highly socialised world. He was awarded Most Promising New Director, Best Screenplay and Best Original Story in the 2005 Malaysian Film Festival for this work. In the same year he was awarded for Best Actor, Best Director and Best Screenplay at the Anugerah Skrin organized by TV3. An eventual sequel, "Buli Balik", was awarded Best Director, Best Original Story and Best Film Awards at the 2006 Malaysian Film Festival and also the Best Director and Best Screenplay Awards at the Anugerah Skrin (TV3) awards of the same year.

Other movies since then include Gila-Gila Pengantin Remaja, Pontianak, Biar Betul and Baik Punya Cilok (which received the Film Goer's Choice Award at the Anugerah Skrin Era Awards of 2006).

In 2007 he produced, co-directed and co-wrote Sumolah under his company Vision Works, which was invited to show at the Fukuoka International Film Festival. He also produced, directed and wrote "Los Dan Faun" under the same company. He played main and supportive roles in both films.

In 2009, Afdlin produced the film Papadom, a story about a distracted, busy father who loses his wife in an accident, and ends up becoming over-protective of his only daughter. This bittersweet comedy drama garnered multiple awards at the 22nd Malaysian Film Festival on the same year for the categories of Best Original Story, Best Actor, Best Film, as well as Best Music Score for Film. Afdlin and his co-star Liyana Jasmay also won the Couple With Best Chemistry in the 2010 Shout Awards organized by 8TV. "Papadom" was in competition in the Asia Pacific International Film Festival held in Taiwan in December 2009. The film also competed in the Osaka Asian Film Festival 2010 in the International Competition and received 3rd place out of 12 movies taking part in the Audience Choice Award. "Papadom" was re-made as a Tamil version for the Malaysian Tamil audience and was released in November 2010.

Politics 
He became a member of the People's Justice Party (PKR) since joining the party in March 2021 together with rapper Altimet. In 2012, it was reported that Afdlin previously had joined UMNO with the hope of getting more people to support the then Barisan Nasional (BN) government under the leadership of former prime minister Najib Razak. On 13 April 2022, it was reported that Afdlin would contest for the position of Setiawangsa PKR branch chief by challenging incumbent Nik Nazmi in the PKR party elections. In response, Nik Nazmi welcomed the "healthy contest" as candidates "would use the platform to propose various initiatives in bringing PKR forward". Afdlin explained his candidacy that he "have no ill-feeling but only utmost respect of Nik Nazmi". On a separate note, he was "driven by the passion to serve the people" and the branch "needs rejuvenations on engagements with the people" and his candidacy "provides members another option of a candidate without political baggage" given to his identity as relatively new PKR member and junior politician without political experience.  However on 29 May 2022, he was defeated by Nik Nazmi who won his reelection as the Setiawangsa PKR branch chief with a total votes of 372 votes and by a minority of 110 votes in unofficial results revealed.  On 7 June 2022, it was reported that he had lodged a police report at Pudu police station two days ago on 5 June 2022 against election committee of PKR (JPP) which he claimed it had failed to ensure the wellbeing of voting process and prevent an ongoing fraud. Afdlin also claimed that there were missing ballot papers when the number of votes announced by the JPP did not tally with the number of votes at the Setiawangsa division polling station. Afdlin raised concrete examples of his claim, the counting of ballot papers was done without a representative of the candidates present and the manner in which the counting process was done was not disclosed and the JPP was also alleged to had appointed the former secretary of the Setiawangsa division as the coordinator of the polling station and the husband of one of the  candidates for the position of women wing of the division to work in the polling station hall during election day. Afdlin then warned that all these could be seen as biased as both of them had a direct relationship with the contesting candidates and there was no guarantee of transparency and integrity as they were also members of the party but not neutral.

Filmography

Film

Television

Stage

Discography

Fuuyo! (2003)
 Aku Lelaki
 Miasara (As OST in Papadom)
 Gadis Pilihan Ibu
 Percaya (As OST in Buli and Buli Balik)
 Waras (As OST in Buli)
 Tiada Lagi
 Tuan Dan Hamba
 Bukan Cinta (As OST in Los Dan Faun)
 Sampai Bila
 Am I Too Late
 Mangsa Keadaan
 Disco Dancer
 Ku Tak Mahu
 Hingga Ke Akhirnya
 Reprise

Others
 Soalnya Hati (duet with Erra Fazira)
 Diva Bermimpi (Themesong of Diva Popular – with Umie Aida, Sheila Rusly & Ezzlynn)
 Baik Punya Cilok (As themesong of Baik Punya Cilok)
 Tanya (As Soundtrack of Sumolah)

Accolades

Others
 Asian Television Award 1999 – Best Presenter

Personal life
Afdlin Shauki was born and grew up in Johor Bahru, Johor. He is an eldest child among 10 siblings in his family to his parents, Fadzilah Jelani (died 2018) and Aksan Abu Bakar (died 2020).

Honours 
 :
  Knight Companion of the Order of the Crown of Pahang (DIMP) – Dato' (2017)

References

External links
 

1971 births
Living people
Johor
Malaysian people of Malay descent
Malaysian film directors
Malaysian male actors
Malaysian comedians
Malaysian hip hop singers
Malaysian funk singers
Malaysian rhythm and blues singers
Malaysian male singer-songwriters
Malaysian singer-songwriters
Malaysian television personalities
Malay-language singers
Malay-language film directors
People's Justice Party (Malaysia) politicians
United Malays National Organisation politicians
21st-century Malaysian people